Introspection is the second studio album by guitarist Greg Howe, released in 1993 through Shrapnel Records.

Critical reception

Andy Hinds at AllMusic awarded Introspection four stars out of five, calling it "a breathtaking showcase of one of the best rock/fusion players in the world" and praising Howe's guitar work: "Howe's wide-interval scale figures and inspired phrasing—delivered at light speed—are truly remarkable. ... Howe's playing has evolved so much from his early Shrapnel days that it's hard to believe it's the same person." In particular he highlighted the stylistic shift from Howe's shred-oriented 1988 debut album, Greg Howe, to a more fusion-based approach on Introspection. However, he criticized the album's production values as "antiseptic" and described the triggered drums as "totally lame".

Track listing

Personnel
Greg Howe – guitar, keyboard, engineering, producer
Kevin Soffera – drums
Alsamad Caldwell – bass (except tracks 3, 6)
Vern Parsons – bass (tracks 3, 6), engineering
Mike Rafferty – engineering
Chris Midkiff – mixing
Kenneth K. Lee Jr. – mastering

References

External links
Greg Howe "Introspection" at Guitar Nine

Greg Howe albums
1993 albums
Shrapnel Records albums
Albums recorded in a home studio